The district-based Boards of Intermediate and Secondary Education in Bangladesh manage the country's three-tiered education system at the primary and secondary level. They are responsible for conducting the examinations for the Secondary School Certificate (S.S.C), the Higher Secondary (School) Certificate (H.S.C) level public examinations. The boards are also responsible for the recognition of private sector educational institutes. 
 
 Board of Intermediate and Secondary Education, Barisal
 Board of Intermediate and Secondary Education, Chittagong
 Board of Intermediate and Secondary Education, Cumilla
 Board of Intermediate and Secondary Education, Dhaka
 Board of Intermediate and Secondary Education, Dinajpur
 Board of Intermediate and Secondary Education, Jessore
 Board of Intermediate and Secondary Education, Mymensingh
 Board of Intermediate and Secondary Education, Rajshahi
 Board of Intermediate and Secondary Education, Sylhet

Two alternative education boards: 
 Bangladesh Madrasah Education Board
 Bangladesh Technical Education Board.

References

Education Board in Bangladesh
Bangladesh education-related lists
Government boards of Bangladesh
Secondary education-related lists